Sabatino "Sabby" Piscitelli (born August 24, 1983) is an American former professional wrestler and former American football player. He is known for his time in WWE, under the ring name Tino Sabbatelli. He also worked for All Elite Wrestling (AEW) under the ring name Sabby.

Prior to joining WWE, Piscitelli played six years in the National Football League (NFL). He was drafted by the Tampa Bay Buccaneers in the second round (64th overall) of the 2007 NFL Draft. He also played for the Cleveland Browns and Kansas City Chiefs. He played collegiately at Oregon State.

Early life 
Sabatino Piscitelli was born on August 24, 1983 in Boca Raton, Florida. Piscitelli began his football career at Boca Raton High School. He began playing as a junior in high school, playing both defensive back and wide receiver. He received second team all-state honors as a senior and received four letters as an outfielder for the school's baseball team.

College football career 

GP – Games Played, T – Tackles, AT – Assisted Tackles, TFL – Tackles for Loss, FF – Forced Fumbles, FR – Fumbles Recovered, PD – Passes Defensed, INTs – Interceptions, TDs – Touchdowns <br/ >
° Redshirted 
† All-Pac 10 Honourable Mention
‡ All-Pac 10 First Team

Professional football career

Tampa Bay Buccaneers 
Piscitelli received an invitation to attend the NFL Combine due to his outstanding performance in his last year at Oregon State University. He posted the fastest pro agility time of 2006, ran a 4.44 second 40-yard dash, and bench pressed 225 lbs for 19 reps. He was selected by the Tampa Bay Buccaneers in the second round of the 2007 NFL Draft. In his rookie season, he broke his right foot and was placed on the injured reserve. On November 30, 2010, the Buccaneers released him.

Cleveland Browns 
Piscitelli was signed by the Cleveland Browns on December 1, 2010. He became a free agent after the season.

Kansas City Chiefs 
Piscitelli signed with the Kansas City Chiefs on August 4, 2011.

Career statistics 

GP – Games Played, ST – Solo Tackles, AT – Assisted Tackles, FF – Forced Fumbles, PD – Passes Defensed, INTs – Interceptions, TDs – Touchdowns

Professional wrestling career

WWE (2014–2020) 

In October 2014, Piscitelli signed a developmental contract with WWE and began training to become a professional wrestler at the WWE Performance Center in Orlando, Florida.

He made his in-ring debut for WWE's developmental territory, NXT, at a live event on April 4, 2015, competing unsuccessfully in a battle royal. After ten months of training, he suffered a concussion during an NXT live event. In October 2015, he was given the ring name Anthony Sabbatelli, later tweaked to Tino Sabbatelli. He was featured on an exclusive TV show on the WWE Network called Breaking Ground, which featured his NXT training.

Sabbatelli made his televised debut on the October 12, 2016, episode of NXT, teaming with Riddick Moss in a loss to TM-61 in the first round of the 2016 Dusty Rhodes Tag Team Classic. He made a further appearance on the January 4, 2017, episode of NXT, again teaming with Moss in a defeat to The Revival. Sabbatelli appeared again on the May 10 episode of NXT, teaming with Moss in a loss to DIY. He had his first televised singles match on the September 20 episode of NXT, losing to Johnny Gargano. Sabbatelli and Moss had their first televised victory on the October 25 episode of NXT, defeating the team of Oney Lorcan and Danny Burch. In early 2018, Sabbatelli and Moss entered the Dusty Rhodes Tag Team Classic losing to Sanity in the first round. Sabbatelli turned on Moss on April 25 after losing to Heavy Machinery. He suffered a torn pectoral muscle at the end of April and underwent surgery. On April 17, 2020, it was announced that he was released from his WWE contract.

All Elite Wrestling (2020) 
Piscitelli made his All Elite Wrestling debut under the ring name Sabby on the July 21, 2020, episode of AEW Dark, teaming with Brady Pierce in a losing effort against Best Friends.

Return to WWE (2020–2021) 
On October 16, 2020, it was reported that Piscitelli had re-signed with WWE. However on June 25, 2021, Piscitelli was once again released from his WWE contract.

Personal life 
Piscitelli is of Italian descent. He has a sister named Sabrina and a brother named Sean, an independent wrestler who performs under the ring name Sean Swag. As of 2018, he is in a relationship with fellow professional wrestler Amanda Saccomanno, better known by the ring name Mandy Rose. On September 17, 2022, they announced their engagement.

Championships and accomplishments 
Pro Wrestling Illustrated
Ranked No. 351 of the top 500 singles wrestlers in the PWI 500 in 2017

References

External links 

Tampa Bay Buccaneers bio

1983 births
Living people
21st-century professional wrestlers
American male professional wrestlers
American professional wrestlers of Italian descent
Professional wrestlers from Florida
American football safeties
Cleveland Browns players
Kansas City Chiefs players
Oregon State Beavers football players
People from Boca Raton, Florida
Tampa Bay Buccaneers players
Boca Raton Community High School alumni